Northwestern Law Review may refer to:
 Northwestern University Law Review
 Northwestern Journal of Technology and Intellectual Property
 Northwestern University Law Review Colloquy
 Journal of Criminal Law & Criminology